Peter Calthorpe (born 1949) is a San Francisco-based architect, urban designer and urban planner. He is a founding member of the Congress for New Urbanism, a Chicago-based advocacy group formed in 1992 that promotes sustainable building practices. For his works on redefining the models of urban and suburban growth in America Calthorpe has been named one of twenty-five ‘innovators on the cutting edge’ by Newsweek magazine.

Early life
Calthorpe was born in London and raised in Palo Alto, California. He attended the Yale School of Architecture.

Career
In the 1986 he, along with Sim Van der Ryn, published Sustainable Communities.  In the early 1990s he developed the concept of Transit Oriented Development (TOD) highlighted in The Next American Metropolis: Ecology, Community, and the American Dream.

He has taught at U.C. Berkeley, the University of Washington, the University of Oregon, and the University of North Carolina.

In 1989, he proposed the concept of Pedestrian Pocket, an up to  pedestrian-friendly, transit-linked, mixed-use urban area with a park at its centre. The Pedestrian Pocket mixes low-rise high-density housing, commercial and retail uses. The concept had a number of similarities with Ebenezer Howard's Garden City and aimed to be an alternative to low-density residential suburban developments.

As an expert on urban planning, Peter Calthorpe, is frequently cited in various reputable mass media including New York Times, The Guardian, National Geographic, Newsweek, Grist, Metropolismag, The Advocate and others.

In 2006 Calthorpe won the ULI J.C. Nichols Prize for Visionaries in Urban Development.

In his 2017 TED Talk Calthorpe addressed the necessity of efficient use of space and resources in the context of climate change and identified urban sprawl an urgent trend that requires immediate attention.

In 2018 Calthorpe launched urban-planning software UrbanFootprint that should help fight sprawl allowing non-experts to model the impacts of different urban planning scenarios.

Among most recent Calthorpe's concerns are autonomous cars as potential reason for increased urban congestion and suburban sprawl. Unlike the advocates of self-driving cars who believe that they will lead to fewer cars and faster commutes, Calthorpe believes that the convenience of autonomous transport will only encourage more car trips. He suggests alternative plan to avoid congestion – autonomous rapid transit – fleets of self-driving vans in reserved lanes on main arteries.

Personal life and family
He is married to Jean Driscoll. He has three children: Lucia, Jacob, and Asa.

His sister Diana Calthorpe is married to real estate developer Jonathan F. P. Rose. His niece is artist Rachel Rose.

Writings
Calthorpe, Peter and Sim Van der Ryn (1986). Sustainable Communities: A New Design Synthesis for Cities, Suburbs and Towns. San Francisco: Sierra Club Books. 
 Calthorpe, Peter: The Pedestrian pocket, in Doug, Kelbaugh (ed.) Pedestrian Pocket Book, 1989
 Calthorpe, Peter: The Next American Metropolis: Ecology, Community, and the American Dream, Princeton Architectural Press, 1993
 Calthorpe, Peter and Fulton, William: The Regional City, Island Press, 2001
 Calthorpe, Peter: Urbanism in the Age of Climate Change, Island Press, 2010

References

External links
Calthorpe Associates

20th-century American architects
American urban planners
New Urbanism
Antioch College alumni
Yale School of Architecture alumni
Living people
Urban designers
1949 births
21st-century American architects
Sustainable transport pioneers